Elsie Randolph (9 December 1904 – 15 October 1982) was an English actress, singer and dancer. Randolph was born and died in London.

She is best remembered for her partnership with Jack Buchanan in several stage and film musicals. She also appeared in two of Alfred Hitchcock's British films, made 40 years apart.

One of her final roles was a guest part in the 1981 television series Funny Man set in the music halls of the late 1920s.

Her papers are in the collection of the University of Birmingham that also has performance details in its collection.

Theatre credits (all London productions)
1919 The Girl for the Boy
1920 The Naughty Princess
1921 My Nieces
1922 His Girl
1923 Battling Buttler
1924
Toni
Madame Pompadour
1925 Boodle
1926 Sunny
1927 Peggy-Ann
1928 That's a Good Girl
 1929 Follow Through
1930
The Co-Optimists
 The Wonder Bar
1931 Stand Up and Sing''''
1934 Mr. Whittington1935 Charlot's Char-a-Bang1936 This'll Make You Whistle1942 The Maid of the Mountains 1943 It's Time To Dance 1945 Great DayFilmography
Film credits
 Rich and Strange (1931) as The Old Maid
 Life Goes On (1932) as Phoebe Selsey
 Brother Alfred (1932) as Mamie
 Yes, Mr Brown (1933) as Anne Weber
 That's a Good Girl (1933) as Joy Dean 
 Night of the Garter (1933) as Jenny Warwick
 This'll Make You Whistle (1936) as Bobbie Rivers
 Smash and Grab (1937) as Alice Thornby / Alice Forrest
 Cheer the Brave (1951) as Doris Wilson
 Riders in the Sky (1968) as Nurse Henderson
 Frenzy (1972) as Gladys

Television appearances
 Harpers West One (1962) as Mrs. Barbara Cater
 The Jimmy Logan Show (1969)
 Fraud Squad (1970) as Agnes Holland
 ITV Sunday Night Theatre (1971) as Iris / Lilian
 Beryl's Lot (1973) as Madge Gold
 Father Brown (1974) as Miss Oliphant
 Within These Walls (1974–1978) as Mrs. Dobbing
 Thriller (1975) as Mrs. Fitch
 Z Cars (1976) as Edna Allbright
 Seven Faces of Woman (1977) as Mrs. Gilmore
 Edward & Mrs. Simpson (1978) as Lady Colefax
 Quatermass (1979) as Woman Minister
 Company and Co (1980) as Mrs. Dersley
 ITV Playhouse (1981) as Mrs. Jackson
 Funny Man (1981) as Mary Hodge
 BBC2 Playhouse (1981) as Emmy (final appearance)

Bibliography
 Stanley Green Encyclopedia of the Musical Theatre, Dodd, Mead, 1976
 Peter Gammond The Oxford Companion To Popular Music'', Oxford University Press, 1991

References

External links
 
 Elsie Randolph performances in University of Bristol Theatre Archive
 Elsie Randolph Collection, University of Birmingham

1904 births
1982 deaths
English stage actresses
English film actresses
Actresses from London
20th-century English actresses